Bawtry is a civil parish in the metropolitan borough of Doncaster, South Yorkshire, England.  The parish contains 44 listed buildings that are recorded in the National Heritage List for England.  Of these, one is listed at Grade I, the highest of the three grades, one is at Grade II*, the middle grade, and the others are at Grade II, the lowest grade.  The parish contains the town of Bawtry and the surrounding area.  Most of the listed buildings are in or near the town centre, and include houses and associated structures, shops, offices, churches, a headstone in a churchyard, a market cross, a hotel, a restaurant, public houses, a pinfold, a Masonic Hall and gate, and a war memorial.  Outside the town are a listed milepost and a bridge.


Key

Buildings

References

Citations

Sources

 

Lists of listed buildings in South Yorkshire
Buildings and structures in the Metropolitan Borough of Doncaster
Listed